The 2017 City of Perth Ladies International was held from March 31 to April 2 at the Dewars Centre in Perth, Scotland as part of the World Curling Tour. The event was held in a round robin format.

Teams
The teams are listed as follows:

Round robin standings 

Ties in the standings are broken first by head-to-head results then by the total distance of the best four pre-game LSD ("last stone draws" - shots taken to determine hammer in the first end) from five.

Playoffs

References

External links

City of Perth Ladies International
International curling competitions hosted by Scotland
Women's curling competitions in Scotland
City of Perth Ladies International
City of Perth Ladies International
Sport in Perth, Scotland
City of Perth Ladies International